Clark Kuppinger (1918–November 18, 1963) was an American politician and attorney who served in the Kansas House of Representatives and Kansas Senate. He spent 5 terms in the Kansas House of Representatives from 1951 to 1960, moving up to the Kansas Senate in 1961; however, he died before completing his first term in the Senate, in 1963.

References

1918 births
1963 deaths
Date of birth missing
Republican Party Kansas state senators
Republican Party members of the Kansas House of Representatives
20th-century American politicians
People from Prairie Village, Kansas
People from Mission, Kansas